The Vagabonds (German: Die Landstreicher) is a 1916 Austrian silent comedy film directed by Jacob Fleck and Luise Fleck and starring Josef König, Liane Haid and Marietta Weber. The film's score was based on the operetta of the same name composed by Karl Michael Ziehrer.

Cast
 Josef König as Fliederbusch 
 Liane Haid as Frau Fliederbusch 
 Marietta Weber as Tänzerin Mimi 
 Emil Guttmann as Fürst Adolar 
 Hans Rhoden

See also
The Vagabonds (1937)

References

Bibliography
 Robert Von Dassanowsky. Austrian Cinema: A History. McFarland, 2005.

External links

1916 Austro-Hungarian films
1916 films
Austrian silent feature films
Austrian comedy films
Films directed by Jacob Fleck
Films directed by Luise Fleck
Austrian black-and-white films
1916 comedy films
Films based on operettas
Silent comedy films